The Tábor–Bechyně railway was the first electrified railway line in the Czech Republic, opening in 1903.

History 
The proposal for construction of the line was submitted to the Czech Diet in 1896.

In 2020, it was announced that the line would be converted to the standard 25 kV at 50 Hz.

Service 
The line also has regular heritage services: On summer weekends Bobinka locomotives are used every two hours, with the original EMUs operating on selected dates.

See also 
Bechyně Bridge, a Czech national cultural monument which carries the line over the Lužnice river

References 

Railway lines in the Czech Republic